Wiseman may refer to:

Places
 Wiseman, Alaska, a US town
 Wiseman, Arkansas, a US town
 Wisemans Bridge, Pembrokeshire, Wales

In fiction
 Wiseman, an antagonist of the second story arc in Sailor Moon
 Wiseman, an antagonist of the Japanese tokusatsu drama Kamen Rider Wizard
 Wiseman, an antagonist of the sixth story arc in Strike the Blood
 Wiseman, the title given to the winner of the Night Party in the light novel, manga, and anime Unbreakable Machine-Doll

Other uses
 Wiseman (surname), includes a list of people with the surname Wiseman
 Wiseman hypothesis, a theory in Biblical criticism
 Müller-Wiseman Dairies, formerly known as Robert Wiseman Dairies, Scottish milk supplier and distributor

See also
 Wise men (disambiguation)
 Wiesmann, an automobile manufacturer